Phoberomys insolita is an extinct species of rodent that was known as the largest rodent on earth, before the discovery of Josephoartigasia monesi. Fossil specimens from the Late Miocene period have been discovered in the Ituzaingó Formation of Argentina.

It has been synonymized with Phoberomys burmeisteri.

See also 

 Phoberomys
 Phoberomys pattersoni

References 

Prehistoric pacaranas
Miocene rodents
Miocene mammals of South America
Huayquerian
Neogene Argentina
Fossils of Argentina
Ituzaingó Formation
Fossil taxa described in 1940